Tuktukan is one of the 28 barangays of Taguig, Metro Manila, Philippines. It is the center of the city (Poblacion) where
the City Hall of Taguig is located.

References 

Taguig
Barangays of Metro Manila